Battleship Memorial Park is a military history park and museum on the western shore of Mobile Bay in Mobile, Alabama. USS Alabama and USS Drum are both National Historic Landmarks; the park as a whole was listed on the Alabama Register of Landmarks and Heritage prior to that time, on October 28, 1977.

History
Citizens of the state of Alabama had formed the "USS Alabama Battleship Commission" to raise funds for the preservation of Alabama as a memorial to the men and women who served in World War II. Alabama's school children raised approximately $100,000 in nickels and dimes from lunch money and allowances to help the cause. The ship was awarded to the state on June 16, 1964, and was formally turned over on July 7, 1964 in ceremonies at Seattle, Washington. Alabama was then towed to her permanent berth at Mobile, Alabama, arriving in Mobile Bay on September 14, 1964 and opening as a museum ship on January 9, 1965. In 2003 a replica of a Confederate submarine that was built in Mobile, CSS , was moved to the park.

Hurricane Katrina caused more than $7 million in damages to Battleship Memorial Park on August 29, 2005 when it came ashore. It almost completely destroyed the aircraft pavilion and gave Alabama an eight-degree list to port and shifting at her permanent anchorage. This forced the park to temporarily close for repairs; it reopened on January 9, 2006.

Features
 The World War II-era battleship .
 The World War II era submarine .
 Bombers and fighter planes ranging from a B-52 from the Vietnam War, a P-51 Mustang flown by the Tuskegee Airmen to an A-12 spyplane.
 A PBR (River Patrol Boat) used in the Vietnam War.
 Military equipment ranging from items such as a Skysweeper M51 anti-aircraft gun to a M4 Sherman tank.
 A Redstone MRBM (medium range ballistic missile).
 Korean War Memorial
 Vietnam War Memorial

Events
The 2001 USA Cross Country Championships were held at a cross country running course in the park.

Political events have not been allowed at the venue since 2012.

Administration
The park is owned by the state of Alabama and is run by an independent government agency, the USS Alabama Battleship Commission. The commission consists of eighteen members appointed by the Alabama governor. It has oversight of all operations at the park.

Gallery

See also
List of museums in Alabama
List of maritime museums in the United States
List of battleships of the United States Navy

References

External links

Battleship Memorial Park (Official website)
USS Drum (SS-228)

Maritime museums in Alabama
Aerospace museums in Alabama
Museums in Mobile, Alabama
National Historic Landmarks in Alabama
Military and war museums in Alabama
Properties on the Alabama Register of Landmarks and Heritage
Naval museums in the United States
National Register of Historic Places in Mobile County, Alabama
Cross country running in Alabama
Battleship museums in the United States
Museums established in 1965